Roberto Fernández Alvarellos (born 25 January 1979), known simply as Roberto, is a Spanish former professional footballer who played as a goalkeeper.

Club career
Roberto was born in Chantada, Lugo. After several years struggling at RC Celta de Vigo, never making it past its B team, he moved to Sporting de Gijón in 2002. Save for his first season, when he was backup to Juanjo Valencia, he was a starter during his spell, winning the Ricardo Zamora Trophy in the 2005–06 campaign by conceding only 31 goals in 38 games whilst going unbeaten for 825 minutes with the Segunda División club.

In June 2008, after playing all the league matches but one to help Sporting return to the top division after a ten-year absence, Roberto also moved to La Liga, signing a three-year contract with CA Osasuna. After spending his first year on the bench, he eventually beat competition from veteran Ricardo (formerly of Manchester United) and became first choice, but lost it again in the 2009–10 season, appearing almost exclusively in the Copa del Rey – he took the field in the league's last two rounds, with the Navarrese already safe from relegation.

On 14 July 2010, Roberto was released by Osasuna and signed a three-year deal with Granada CF, returned to the second tier after 22 years. He only missed two games in the regular season in his first year, then starred in the play-offs in an eventual second consecutive promotion for the Andalusians.

Roberto started in three of the four following seasons, all spent in the top flight. He joined CD Lugo on 17 July 2015, after his contract expired.

On 1 June 2018, after spent the majority of his spell with the Galicians as second choice, Roberto announced his retirement at the age of 39.

References

External links

Celta de Vigo biography 

1979 births
Living people
Sportspeople from the Province of Lugo
Spanish footballers
Footballers from Galicia (Spain)
Association football goalkeepers
La Liga players
Segunda División players
Segunda División B players
Tercera División players
Celta de Vigo B players
Sporting de Gijón players
CA Osasuna players
Granada CF footballers
CD Lugo players